Buttafuori is an Italian television series.

Cast
 Valerio Mastandrea: Cianca
 Marco Giallini: Sergej

See also
List of Italian television series

External links
 

Italian television series